Meligalas is a town and former municipality in Messenia, Peloponnese, Greece. Since the 2011 local government reform it is part of the municipality Oichalia, of which it is a municipal unit. The municipal unit has an area of 78.193 km2. Population 3,385 (2011).

The town is known for the Battle of Meligalas, which took place on 13–15 September 1944 between the Greek Resistance forces of the Greek People's Liberation Army (ELAS) and the collaborationist Security Battalions. After the battle ELAS forces executed hundreds of Security Battalionists in an event that remains a point of reference and a rallying cry both for the far right and the left in Greece to this day.

References

Populated places in Messenia